Andrés Barbero (1877, Asunción – 1951, Buenos Aires) was a Paraguayan scientist and botanist.

Childhood and studies
Juan Barbero and Carolina Crosa, immigrants from Piamonte, reached Paraguay when the Paraguayan War had just finished. They married in Asunción in 1871 and had five children, the third of which was Andrés José Camilo.

Juan Barbero, severe and peninsular diligent, dedicated to the construction and recovery of the destroyed houses during the war. He gained an important fortune, becoming a solid landowner of urban and rural ranches. In 1910, he acquired a valuable house in España Avenue and extended as far as the railroad, present day Gondra Street.

Andrés Barbero was born in Asunción on July 28, 1877. He finished his pharmacy studies in 1898 and, in 1903, his medicine studies, being among the first people who received their medical diploma in Paraguay.

His wealthy position allowed him to dedicate himself completely to teaching, beginning with the National School and later in the same Medicine University, in the subjects of physical medicine, physiology and histology.

Investigation and philanthropic work
He investigated a lot in company with other scientists like Emilio Hassler and Guillermo Tell Bertoni, and also the Paraguayan Teodoro Rojas. With them he founded the Scientific Society in Paraguay. His attachment to the botanic took him to the Natural History Museum, being able later to become the editor of Paraguay's Scientific Magazine.

He financially supplied places where the organizations created by him worked:  la Cruz Roja, the Cancer Institute, the Scientific Society, a children Hospital and an ophthalmologic centre.
He built a three-story building in the corner of España Avenue and Mompox, to be the site of his scientific institutions that grouped there, with the help of the Barbero Foundation. The Natural Science Museum  was also installed there, now, the Andres Barbero's Museum and Library.

From the 1940s on:  Other institutions were created: Paraguay's Ethnographic Society, Paraguay's Indian Society, the Paraguayan Institute of Historical Investigation, from the one later was created the Paraguayan Academy of History and Guarani Culture Society.
In 1941 he won the decoration of the Merit National Order as Great Official

Public life
 Principal of the Municipal Chemistry Department.
 He worked in the Bacteriology National Institute with the Doctor Miguel Elmassian.
 He was temporary Dean of the Medicine University (1905)
 Principal of the Public Attendance
 Agricultural Bank Adviser (1912).
 He created the Anti-Tuberculosis Paraguayan League (1919)
 Asuncion's mayor until  1921
 President of the First Panamerican Conference of the  la Cruz Roja (1923)
 Founded the Cruz Roja which worked outstandingly during the Chaco War. Its hospital was inaugurated in 1937
 Created the gynecologist school in the Cruz Roja
 Temporary Ministry of treasure during Félix Paiva's government (1938)
Andrés Barbero inherited from his father the inclination to work and the virtue of jealous goods administrator.

Death and legacy
Barbero, single and with no offspring, died on February 14, 1951. The Paraguayan Government decreed a national mourning the day of his death.

The Barbero sisters donated all his goods to the La Piedad Foundation, created in honor to him. This respectable institution allows keeping in force the different associations that gather men that search the improvement of the social and cultural conditions of the citizenship, in time of paying homage to the humanitarian and solidarity of its creator.

In Asunción, there is a modest monument that evokes Dr. Barbero's figure in Artigas Avenue and  Brasil Street.

Abbreviation

References

“Cien vidas paraguayas”. Carlos Zubizarreta
“100 paraguayos del siglo XX”. Colección de artículos publicados en Última Hora
“Vida, personalidad y obras del Doctor Andrés Barbero”. Ángel D. Sosa

External links
 
 Museo de Andrés Barbero
 Sociedad Científica del Paraguay

1877 births
1951 deaths
Paraguayan botanists
Paraguayan scientists